Daniel J. McGillicuddy (August 27, 1859 – July 30, 1936) was a United States representative from Maine.

Biography
McGillicuddy was born in Lewiston on August 27, 1859, to John and Ellen McGillicuddy, both Irish immigrants. He attended the common schools and then Bates College in Lewiston from 1877 to 1880. He graduated from Bowdoin College in 1881. He studied law, was admitted to the bar in 1883 and commenced practice in Lewiston.

He was elected a member of the Maine House of Representatives, was elected Mayor of Lewiston, and was a delegate at large from Maine to the Democratic National Conventions in 1892, 1904, 1912, and 1920. He was an unsuccessful candidate for election in 1906 to the Sixtieth Congress and in 1908 to the Sixty-first Congress. He was elected as a Democrat to the Sixty-second, Sixty-third, and Sixty-fourth Congresses (March 4, 1911 – March 3, 1917).

He was an unsuccessful candidate for reelection in 1916 to the Sixty-fifth Congress and for election in 1918 to the Sixty-sixth Congress. He was a member of the Democratic National Committee from 1917 to 1932. He continued the practice of law in Lewiston until his death in that city on July 30, 1936. He was interred in Mount Hope Cemetery.

McGillicuddy was the last representative from Maine's second congressional district to lose re-election until Republican Bruce Poliquin lost re-election to Democrat Jared Golden in 2018.

See also
First McGillicuddy Block

References

External links

1859 births
1936 deaths
American people of Irish descent
Bowdoin College alumni
Maine lawyers
Bates College alumni
Mayors of Lewiston, Maine
Democratic Party members of the Maine House of Representatives
Democratic Party members of the United States House of Representatives from Maine